Trail of the Screaming Forehead is a 2007 American science fiction comedy film written by, directed by and starring Larry Blamire.

Cast
Brian Howe as Big Dan Frater
Dan Conroy as Dutch "The Swede" Annacrombie
Andrew Parks as Dr. Philip Latham
Fay Masterson as Dr. Sheila Bexter
Alison Martin as Millie Healey
Jennifer Blaire as Droxy Chappelle
Larry Blamire as Nick Vassidine
Betty Garrett as Mrs. Cuttle
Dick Miller as Eddie
Daniel Roebuck as Amos
Susan McConnell as Sarah
H.M. Wynant as Dr. Applethorpe
Trish Geiger as Mary Latham
Robert Deveau as Chief Bartnett
James Karen as Reverend Beaks
Kevin McCarthy as Latecomer

References

External links
 
 

American science fiction comedy films
2007 comedy films
2007 science fiction films
2007 films
IFC Films films
2000s English-language films
2000s American films